The Nayapara refugee camp is a refugee camp in Teknaf, Cox's Bazar, Bangladesh. It is located next to the village of Dhumdumia and is inhabited mostly by Rohingya people that have fled from religious persecution in the neighboring country Myanmar. It is one of two government-run refugee camps in Cox's Bazar, the other being the larger Kutupalong refugee camp. The two refugee camps had a combined population of around 30,000 refugees in July 2017. In September 2017, the United Nations High Commissioner for Refugees (UNHCR) estimated that the combined population of the two refugee camps had increased to over 77,000. As of 14 January 2018, the estimated population of Nayapara refugee camp is around 23,065.

On January 14, 2021, a fire in the camp destroyed around 550 shelters, 150 shops, and a community center, resulting in a loss of homes and belongings for 3,500 Rohingya refugees. The UN World Food Programme, Inter Sector Coordination Group, and Bangladesh Red Crescent were among the organizations offering assistance.

References

Bangladesh–Myanmar border
Bangladesh–Myanmar relations
Refugee camps in Bangladesh
Rohingya diaspora
Populated places in Cox's Bazar District